Eugenio Ravignani (10 December 1932 – 7 May 2020) was an Italian Roman Catholic bishop.

Ravignani was born in Italy and was ordained to the priesthood in 1955. He served as bishop of the Roman Catholic Diocese of Vittorio Veneto, Italy, from 1983 to 1997 and as bishop of the Roman Catholic Diocese of Trieste, Italy, from 1997 to 2009.

Notes

1932 births
2020 deaths
21st-century Italian Roman Catholic bishops
20th-century Italian Roman Catholic bishops